The Battle Born World Tour is the fourth major concert tour by American rock band The Killers, in support of their fourth studio album Battle Born, which was released in September 2012. The tour included the band's biggest show to date at Wembley Stadium. It also saw them visit new territories including Russia, Ukraine, China and South East Asia. The tour was the 43rd highest grossing worldwide during 2013.

Synopsis
During the summer of 2012, The Killers played festivals across Europe and North America as well as intimate shows in small venues. The band then began a promo tour in September 2012, before the proper tour started on October 26, 2012 in Glasgow, Scotland. The band then went on to play shows in 41 different countries across Europe, North America, South America, Asia and Oceania. Ted Sablay who toured with the band during the Sam's Town Tour returned as an additional musician, alongside Jake Blanton who previously toured with frontman Brandon Flowers during his solo tour.

The stage setup included a giant lightbulb keyboard stand similar to the one used during the Day & Age World Tour but this time in the shape of the lightning bolt from the cover of the Battle Born album. The pyrotechnics for the tour were provided by Le Maitre Events. 

On November 13, 2012 the band's show at Manchester Arena was stopped during the fifth song of the night "Bling (Confession of a King)" with lead singer Brandon Flowers telling the crowd that his voice had 'gone' and he couldn't continue, the following night's show also in Manchester was cancelled. Two days later both shows were rescheduled and eventually took place on 17 and 18 February 2013.

The band's shows on December 13, 14 & 15th in Camden, New York City & Toronto were cancelled after Brandon Flowers contracted laryngitis, the band were later forced to cancel a number of shows during their European tour in March 2013 due to winter storms. All of these shows were rescheduled for May & June 2013 with the exception of the band's scheduled appearance Caprices Festival in Switzerland which was cancelled indefinitely.

Bassist Mark Stoermer didn't perform with the band during the Asian leg of the tour, believed to be as a result of a back injury. He tweeted "Everything is alright, just need to spend this time at home. Looking forward to returning." Keuning was stressed during his absence, telling the NME that he was "sick of this". Jake Blanton played bass in his absence. He returned for the final show of the tour in Las Vegas.

Wembley Stadium
On June 22, 2013 the band headlined Wembley Stadium, it was their biggest show to date with 69,745 people in attendance. At the show, the band performed a new song that was written specifically for the night titled 'The Wembley Song', the song namechecked various bands who had headlined both the old and new stadium, and also made references to the 1966 World Cup Final and the old stadiums famous Twin Towers. The final verse of the song explored the band's career to date ("From Dave's Apartment to Wembley").

Later that night the band headed across town to play a surprise set at the 600 capacity The Garage, London. Fans were let in on a first-come, first-served basis and the setlist consisted of a mix of hits and more obscure tracks that the band rarely play live. The band had done a similar thing in El Paso the previous month. Both shows were professionally filmed by director Giorgio Testi, a video of the 'Wembley Song' was posted on the band's official YouTube channel and they have hinted that more footage from the show may be released at some point.

Critical reviews were positive, Mark Beaumont in The Guardian gave a 5 star review calling it "A night the stadium league got a whole lot brighter, and lightning struck London twice". In a glowing write-up Gigwise stated "their 23-song strong set feels like every good Wembley gig should: historic". In another good review the Evening Standard remarked "The Killers seemed genuinely thrilled to be here, especially as their career first burst into life in London".

Set list

Covers
During this tour Guitarist Dave Keuning and Singer Brandon Flowers would often play a short cover that had some sort of connection to the town or region in which the band were performing. These included songs by The Beatles, Oasis, The Smiths, U2, Van Morrison, Alphaville, Frank Sinatra, The Strokes, Travis, Prince, Crowded House, Otis Redding, Johnny Cash, Bruce Springsteen, Dean Martin, Bob Seger and more. On January 26, 2013,  Australia Day, the band performed in Melbourne, and did a cover of the Australian folk song "Waltzing Matilda". During their headline performance at Life Is Beautiful Festival on October 27, 2013 they performed a cover of Pale Blue Eyes in tribute to Lou Reed who had died earlier that day.

Personnel

The Killers
 Brandon Flowers – lead vocals, keyboards, piano, bass on "For Reasons Unknown"
 Dave Keuning – lead guitar, backing vocals
 Mark Stoermer – bass, backing vocals, rhythm guitar on "For Reasons Unknown"
 Ronnie Vannucci Jr. – drums, percussion

Additional musicians
 Ted Sablay – rhythm guitar, lead guitar, keyboards, backing vocals
 Jake Blanton – keyboards, rhythm guitar, lead guitar, backing vocals, bass (during the tour of Asia, except for "For Reasons Unknown")
 Rob Whited – percussion
 Bobby Lee Parker – acoustic guitar

Opening acts
Tegan & Sara: October 26 – December 3, 2012, December 13–21, 2012
Louis XIV: December 28–29, 2012 February 26 – March 11, 2013 April 9–14, 2013
Most Thieves: December 28–29, 2012; June 6, 2013; June 17, 2013
Steve Smyth: January 22, 2013
Howling Bells: February 17–22, 2013
We Are The Grand: April 2, 2013
The Felice Brothers: April 27 – May 2, 2013
The Virgins: May 6–19, 2013, August 1, 2013 August 3–17, 2013
The Gaslight Anthem: June 22, 2013
James: June 22, 2013
Frank Ocean: July 13, 2013
Two Door Cinema Club: July 13, 2013
Haim: July 13, 2013
Kyoto Protocol: September 22, 2013
Sandwich: September 26, 2013

Tour dates

Cancellations and rescheduled shows

Festivals and other miscellaneous performances

Box office score data

TV

Notable television performances

References

The Killers concert tours
2012 concert tours
2013 concert tours
Concerts at Malmö Arena